Mari Aldon (born Marija Aldona Pauliutė; 17 November 1925 – 31 October 2004) was a Lithuanian-born American actress.

Early life 
Mari Aldon was born in Tauragė, Lithuania. Her father Antanas Paulius was a policeman, mother Antanina (Antosė) Paulienė was a nurse. Father moved to America looking for a job. Soon after, when Mari was three years old, her mother also moved to Toronto, Canada with her daughter. There, she attended Givens Public School and Central High School. She studied ballet, drama, piano, and singing. Her early performances were noticed in Lithuanian newspapers of America. She had a sister.

Career 
Before Aldon began working in films, she acted for 11 months in a road company of A Streetcar Named Desire and danced with the Canadian Ballet. She also appeared on radio with Alan Young and on The Great Gildersleeve.

After making her screen debut in a minor role in The Locket (1946) she gradually evolved to playing supporting or lead roles. Her most notable performance was starring opposite Gary Cooper in the 1951 Western Distant Drums. By the mid-1950s she was appearing either in B Pictures like the British thriller Mask of Dust (1954) or in supporting roles in more expensive films such as David Lean's Summertime (1955).

After this point she worked largely in television, such as on the TV Western Wagon Train in 1959 as Freda Johnson in "The Vivian Carter Story" (S2E23) and in 1960 as Hester Millikan in "The Jeremy Dow Story" (S4E14). She guest-starred in a 1961 episode of Ichabod and Me.

Personal life 
Aldon married Tay Garnett in London, England on 13 August 1953. Their daughter, Tiela Aldon Garnett (later Daniels), was born in Los Angeles, California on 25 October 1955.

On 17 January 1958, Aldon became a US citizen. In August 1970, Aldon filed for divorce from Garnett in Los Angeles, she was widowed seven years later. Aldon and Garnett had a ranch, near King Vidor in Paso Robles, California. Close relatives still live in her hometown of Tauragė, Lithuania, with whom she kept in touch.

Death
Aldon died on 31 October 2004 in Las Vegas, aged 78, of cancer.

Filmography

References

Bibliography 
 Aaker, Everett. George Raft: The Films. McFarland, 2013.

External links 

 

1925 births
2004 deaths
American film actresses
20th-century American actresses
Lithuanian emigrants to Canada
Canadian emigrants to the United States
Deaths from cancer in Nevada
21st-century American women